Sde Nitzan (lit. Field of (Flower) Buds) is a moshav  in the northern Negev desert in Israel. Located twelve kilometres east of Kerem Shalom and near Beersheba, it falls under the jurisdiction of Eshkol Regional Council.

History
The moshav was established in 1973 by immigrants from English speaking countries, with the name being an approximate translation of the name of a Jewish philanthropist named Bloomfield ("Field of Flowers").

References

Moshavim
Gaza envelope
Populated places in Southern District (Israel)
1973 establishments in Israel
Populated places established in 1973